Heteropappus is a genus of Asian flowering plants in the family Asteraceae.

 Species
 Heteropappus biennis (Ledeb.) Tamamsch. ex Grub. - Mongolia
 Heteropappus boweri (Hemsl.) Grierson - Gansu, Qinghai, Xinjiang, Tibet, Yunnan
 Heteropappus chejuensis Kitam. - Korea
 Heteropappus crenatifolius (Hand.-Mazz.) Grierson - China, Tibet, Nepal
 Heteropappus gouldii (C.E.C.Fisch.) Grierson - Qinghai, Tibet, Bhutan, Sikkim
 Heteropappus holohermaphroditus Grierson - Pakistan, Kashmir
 Heteropappus magnicalathinus J.Q.Fu - Shaanxi
 Heteropappus medius (Krylov) Tamamsch. - Altay
 Heteropappus oldhamii (Hemsl.) Kitam. - Taiwan 
 Heteropappus rupicola (Vaniot & H.Lév.) Kitam. - Korea
 Heteropappus tataricus (Lindl. ex DC.) Tamamsch. - Japan, Korea, Mongolia, China, Siberia
 Heteropappus villosus Kom. - Russian Far East

References

Asteraceae genera
Astereae